The Sahitya Gaurav Puraskar (Gujarati: સાહિત્ય ગૌરવ પુરસ્કાર), also known as Sahitya Gaurav Award, is a literary honour in Gujarat, India. The award is conferred by Gujarat Sahitya Akademi and the Government of Gujarat to the Gujarati authors for their significant contribution in Gujarati literature. In 1985, Umashankar Joshi rejected the Sahitya Gaurav Award.

Recipients 
Following is the list of recipients:

References 

Awards established in 1984
1984 establishments in Gujarat
Gujarati literary awards